is a Japanese fantasy sex comedy manga series written by Amahara and illustrated by masha. It has been serialized through Nico Nico Seiga's manga website Dragon Dragon Age since August 2016 and has been collected in eight tankōbon volumes by Fujimi Shobo. The series is licensed in English by Yen Press. A 12-episode television anime adaptation produced by Passione aired from January to March 2020.

Synopsis
In a world where many different humanoid species exist and prostitution is legal, there exist various brothels for each kind of species with "succu-girls" (サキュ嬢, Sakyu-jō), who have succubus blood running through them. As each species has different opinions on how each succu-girl works for them, various brothel visitors have become reviewers, rating their experiences with various succu-girls and posting them in the local tavern. The series largely centers on a human named Stunk, an elf named Zel, and an angel named Crimvael; Stunk and Zel's goal is to have experiences with every kind of succu-girl there is, to the point where they even wish take their quest all the way to Heaven, while Crimveal (nicknamed "Crim") is searching for the missing piece of their halo, for they're unable to return to Heaven without it.

Characters

A male human adventurer and one of the reviewers. He values appearance when it comes to succu-girls.

A male elf adventurer and one of the reviewers. He values succu-girls who have a high mana level.

An angel with a broken halo who is rescued by Stunk and Zel and begins working at the Ale & Eats until they can repair their halo and return to Heaven. Although Crimvael possesses both male and female genitalia, they hide this fact from most others, allowing most people to believe they are male in order to avoid unwanted attention from Stunk and Zel. Crimvael is not very assertive and is somewhat embarrassed by the fact that they are by far the "largest" among the Reviewers.

A birdmaid waitress at the Ale & Eats, who is often dismayed at the antics of the reviewers and will get into a violent rage if they get her involved with their perverted behavior.

An elderly human female prostitute. Despite her physical appearance, she is a favorite of Zel due to her high quality of mana.

A male halfling reviewer. He has a fetish for BDSM in playing the role of the master.

A dogman reviewer with a preference for plump succu-girls. He grades the quality of succu-girls based on his sensitive senses.

A lamia reviewer.

A demon reviewer.

An honorary fairy reviewer.

An honorary vampire reviewer. His name is translated as Count Call Girlula in Yen Press releases.

An archmage who runs a Magical Metropolis brothel offering copies of herself. She also endorses several establishments, including a gender-swap inn. She has a particular interest in Crimvael's unique properties. It's eventually revealed that she has the missing piece of Crim's halo, but what she plans to do with it is unknown.

A female elf prostitute. She is often looked down upon by non-human species for being over 500 years old.

A catgirl prostitute who essentially starts Crimvael on their "journey" by being the first succu-girl they ever lay with.

A prostitute with tentacles (a Cecaelia; though the series refers to her as a Dagon).

A birdmaid prostitute.

A fairy madam and the proprietor of the Fairy Nectar brothel. She fornicates with clients as a hobby.

A female minotaur prostitute with blue eyes and tan skin.

A female minotaur prostitute with green eyes and fair skin.

A spotted hyena girl prostitute who seems to be one of Crimvael's favorites.

A female halfling prostitute.

A female elf prostitute.

A female fire spirit (salamander) prostitute.

An incubus reviewer who likes every type of woman to the point where he gives them all perfect tens, which inadvertently makes his reviews useless.

A female spirit (ghost) prostitute.

Media

Manga
The first chapter was launched on July 7, 2016 as a special one-shot in Fujimi Shobo's shōnen magazine Monthly Dragon Age; the manga began monthly serialization through Nico Nico Seiga's affiliated comic website Dragon Dragon Age on August 19. Amahara had previously drawn a similar 18+ comic series entitled  on Pixiv beginning in September 2014. As of November 2022, the manga has been collected in eight tankōbon volumes published by Kadokawa. A manga anthology, illustrated by various artists, titled Interspecies Reviewers Comic Anthology: Darkness  was released on January 9, 2020, with the second volume released on February 9, 2021. The main manga and the anthology are licensed in North America by Yen Press, which announced an English paperback release at Sakura-Con on March 31, 2018.

Interspecies Reviewers Comic Anthology: Darkness

Light novel
A light novel adaptation entitled Interspecies Reviewers: Ecstacy Days was published by Kadokawa on December 7, 2018. A sequel, Interspecies Reviewers: Marionette Crisis, was published on January 9, 2020. The novels are licensed in North America by Yen Press; the first was released on August 18, 2020.

Anime
On June 28, 2019, Kadokawa announced that the manga would receive a television anime adaptation produced by Passione. The 12-episode series was directed by Yuki Ogawa and written by Kazuyuki Fudeyasu, with character designs by Makoto Uno and music composed by Kotone Uchihigashi. Junji Majima, Yūsuke Kobayashi, and Miyu Tomita (the voice actors of Stunk, Zel, and Crimvael, respectively) performed the opening theme song  and the ending theme .

The series premiered on AT-X on January 11, 2020, with a censored version later airing on Tokyo MX, BS11, KBS, and SUN. In February 2020, Tokyo MX cancelled its broadcast due to "changes in circumstances within [the station]", while SUN cancelled future airings of the series at the behest of channel company's management. It began airing on GBS on February 28 and on BBC on March 7, 2020.

The anime was licensed in North America by Funimation, which simulcasted the first three censored episodes with English subtitles and later released a dubbed version of the first episode. However, the company removed the series from its online streaming platform on January 31, stating that it "fell outside of [Funimation's] standards". On February 1, the company's French subsidiary Wakanim announced that it would discontinue the English release, but continued offering the anime with French, German, and Russian subtitles. On February 2, Australian subsidiary AnimeLab announced that it would continue simulcasting the series in Australia and New Zealand after "adjusting [its] sourcing of materials". On February 6, Amazon Prime Video removed the anime from its service.

Critical Mass Video planned to release the series with English subtitles completely uncensored on Blu-ray on December 7, 2021, but it was delayed until January 18, 2022.

Reception
In August 2017, the manga was awarded the "DLsite Award" by Media Factory's manga news magazine Da Vinci and the streaming service Niconico.

The anime adaptation was controversial because it walked "the thin line of how explicit anime can be" as Isiah Jones of CBR noted. Stig Høgset of THEM Anime Reviews called the series "surprisingly entertaining" and sex positive while saying that it is "well thought out" with many of the sex workers having "distinct personalities" and said the show got away with a lot when it came to imagery. added that the series bends the viewer's "expectations out of shape", felt uncomfortable with some parts of it, noted that the language used is direct, and praised it for being "animated pretty well". He concluded the review by saying that the series is one of the better "sex positive shows out there" and called it a "new record in openly sexual fun" but cannot be considered hentai, giving it a rating of 4 out of 5 stars.

Notes

References

External links
  
  
 

2020 anime television series debuts
2020s Japanese LGBT-related television series
Angels in popular culture
Angels in television
Animation controversies in television
Anime and manga controversies
Anime series based on manga
AT-X (TV network) original programming
Censored television series
Elves in popular culture
Fantasy anime and manga
Fujimi Shobo manga
Funimation
Japanese LGBT-related animated television series
Kadokawa Dwango franchises
Obscenity controversies in animation
Obscenity controversies in television
Passione (company)
Prostitution in comics
Prostitution in television
Sex comedy anime and manga
Shōnen manga
Television censorship in Japan
Yen Press titles